Inconceivable may refer to:

Books
 Inconceivable (novel), a 1999 novel by Ben Elton

Film
"Inconceivable!", a catch-phrase used by the character Vizzini (played by Wallace Shawn) in the 1987 film The Princess Bride. It did not mean what he thought it meant.
 Inconceivable, a 1998 American comedy film starring Corinne Bohrer
 Inconceivable (2008 film), a 2008 film directed by Mary McGuckian
 Inconceivable, also known as Deadly Ex, a 2016 American thriller film starring Natasha Henstridge
 Inconceivable (2017 film), a 2017 American thriller film starring Gina Gershon and Nicolas Cage

Television
Inconceivable (TV series), a 2005 TV series starring Angie Harmon
Inconceivable , a 2017 web series starring Katie Stuart
"Inconceivable", an episode from the ninth season of Law & Order: Special Victims Unit
"Inconceivable", an episode from the third season of the U.S. TV series Perception
"Inconceivable", an episode from the seventh season of Coach

See also
 Unbelievable (disambiguation)